Anna-Giulia Remondina (born 1 June 1989) is an Italian former tennis player. On 2 May 2011, she reached her highest WTA singles ranking of 219, whilst her best doubles ranking was 444 on 12 August 2013.

She made her WTA Tour main-draw debut at the 2011 Budapest Grand Prix, qualifying as a lucky loser.

ITF Circuit finals

Singles: 24 (10 titles, 14 runner-ups)

Doubles: 20 (4 titles, 16 runner-ups)

References

External links
 
 

1989 births
Living people
Italian female tennis players
20th-century Italian women
21st-century Italian women